Tankai fort is a hill, part of the Satmala Range, with the ruins of a large Maratha hill fort on the peak. With Ankai Fort near this fort are known as Ankai-Tankai, the strongest hill fort in the Nashik district, rises about 900 feet above the plain and 3200 feet above the sea. It is located from Manmad in Yeola taluka of Nashik district in Maharashtra, India.

References

Forts in Nashik district